Bãi Cháy is a beach resort in Vietnam. The ward of Bãi Cháy, along with Hong Gai, together are officially referred to as Hạ Long City, though few locals use this term for Bãi Cháy. The centre of tourism in Hạ Long Bay is Bãi Cháy beach. The Bãi Cháy Bridge now links Bai Chay and Hong Gai, making the old Bãi Cháy ferry redundant.

Geography
Topographic feature is a low elevation range of hills sloping gently toward the sea.

Etymology
According to legend, Bãi Cháy is the place where Trần Dynasty's forces led by Tran Khanh Du burned Mongols' vessels. Northeast wind then blew fire toward the west side of Cửa Lục Bay and set fire to the dried forest nearby. This explains the origin of the name "Bãi Cháy" which literally means "burned/burning beach".

Another folk-story says that in the past, boats used to anchor at the west side of Cửa Lục. Fishermen gathered and burned Casuarinaceae's leaves around those vessels in order to deal with shipworm that bored into them. Since people from Hong Gai and elsewhere saw fire blazing up from this place all the time, they coined the name "Bãi Cháy". Under the French, this became Vatchay.

References

Beaches of Vietnam
Landforms of Quảng Ninh province
Tourist attractions in Quảng Ninh province
Communes of Quảng Ninh province
Populated places in Quảng Ninh province